The 2011 Savannah Challenger was a professional tennis tournament played on clay courts. It was the third edition of the tournament which was part of the 2011 ATP Challenger Tour. It took place in Savannah, Georgia, United States between 2 and 8 May 2011.

ATP entrants

Seeds

 Rankings are as of April 25, 2011.

Other entrants
The following players received wildcards into the singles main draw:
  Andrea Collarini
  Denis Kudla
  Mark Oljaca
  Wesley Whitehouse

The following players received entry from the qualifying draw:
  Amer Delić
  Luka Gregorc
  Wayne Odesnik
  Morgan Phillips

Champions

Singles

 Wayne Odesnik def.  Donald Young, 6–4, 6–4

Doubles

 Rik de Voest /  Izak van der Merwe def.  Sekou Bangoura /  Jesse Witten, 6–3, 6–3

External links
Official Website
ITF Search
ATP official site

2011
2011 ATP Challenger Tour
Clay court tennis tournaments
Tennis tournaments in Georgia (U.S. state)
May 2011 sports events in the United States